is a railway station on the Chuo Main Line in the town of Shimosuwa, Suwa District, Nagano Prefecture, Japan, operated by East Japan Railway Company (JR East).

Lines
Shimo-Suwa Station is served by the Chūō Main Line and is 206.3 kilometers from the terminus of the line at Tokyo Station.

Station layout
Shimo-Suwa Station has one side platform and one island platform serving three tracks. The station has a Midori no Madoguchi staffed ticket office.

Platforms

History
The station opened on 25 November 1905. With the privatization of Japanese National Railways (JNR) on 1 April 1987, the station came under the control of JR East. The station building was rebuilt in 1998.

Passenger statistics
In fiscal 2015, the station was used by an average of 1,982 passengers daily (boarding passengers only).

Surrounding area
Suwa taisha
Shimosuwa Town Hall

See also
 List of railway stations in Japan

References

External links

  

Railway stations in Nagano Prefecture
Chūō Main Line
Railway stations in Japan opened in 1905
Stations of East Japan Railway Company
Shimosuwa, Nagano